Spritz may refer to:
 Hair spray
 Spritz (cocktail), an aperitif consisting of wine, sparkling water, and liqueur
 Spritz (wine), a term referring to small amounts of carbon dioxide added to wine
 Spritz (cipher), a cryptographic stream cipher and hash function by Rivest and Schuldt.

See also 
 Spritzer
 Spritzgebäck, a type of Christmas cookie

German words and phrases